Genewars is a real-time strategy video game for DOS featuring standard elements of strategy, along with minor terrain editing and cross-species breeding. Its working title was "Biosphere".

Gameplay
Players move through a series of worlds using a small number of sentient humanoids to build small bases and to stun, kill, research, and ultimately breed a variety of animals. Plants are also important, as different plants can be grown and harvested for different purposes. Players must use the various plant and animal species available to them (as well as hybrid animals) to deal with different environments, enemies, and tasks. For instance, a crab is a good armored defender, while a mule is a perfect detritus transporter. The two can be bred to form a creature that is well armored, but also suited to mule work. The more a particular species has been studied and created, the more effective future individuals will be.

The primary resource of the game is goop, which is derived from all kinds of biomass.

Development
Genewars was developed by Bullfrog Productions.

Sean Cooper was brought in to help with the game's development, causing tension between him and Peter Molyneux.

Reception

Genewars received average reviews from video game critics upon release.

It was given the dubious honor of "Most Disappointing Game" of 1996 by GameSpot.

Simon Parkin, writing for IGN, considered the game to be Molyneux's least known creation, noting the game bearing "unmistakable signs of his design influence."

References

External links

1996 video games
Bullfrog Productions games
DOS games
DOS-only games
Electronic Arts games
Multiplayer and single-player video games
Real-time strategy video games
Video games about extraterrestrial life
Video games developed in the United Kingdom
Video games scored by Russell Shaw
Video games with isometric graphics